み, in hiragana, or ミ in katakana, is one of the Japanese kana, each of which represents one mora. The hiragana is written in two strokes, while the katakana is made in three. Both represent .

Stroke order

Other communicative representations

 Full Braille representation

 Computer encodings

References 

Specific kana